La'Darius Hamilton (born January 18, 1998) is an American football outside linebacker for the Green Bay Packers of the National Football League (NFL). He played college football at North Texas, and originally signed with the Dallas Cowboys as an undrafted free agent in 2020. He has also played for the Tampa Bay Buccaneers.

Personal life and high school
LaDarius Hamilton was born on January 18, 1998, in Corrigan, Texas. He attended Corrigan-Camden High School, where he was first-team all-district as a junior and senior while playing up to 6 positions on the football team.

College career
After finishing high school, Hamilton attended North Texas University. Hamilton was a three-star recruit coming into North Texas, and in his first year was featured on the Conference USA All-Freshman team. In Hamilton's junior year, in a game against Louisiana Tech, Hamilton wore Mean Joe Greene's retired number 75 on his jersey. Also in his junior year he was featured on the First-team All-Conference USA team. By the end of his senior year, Hamilton was tied for sixth in North Texas career sacks and tackles for loss.

Professional career

Dallas Cowboys
After going undrafted in the 2020 NFL Draft, Hamilton was signed by the Dallas Cowboys. He spent the entire year on the Cowboys' practice squad in the 2020 NFL season and was waived on May 5, 2021.

Tampa Bay Buccaneers
On May 6, 2021, Hamilton was claimed off of waivers by the Tampa Bay Buccaneers. He did not make the active roster but did make the practice squad at the beginning of the 2021 NFL season.

Green Bay Packers

2021
Hamilton was signed off the Buccaneers' practice squad by the Green Bay Packers on September 17, 2021, to fill the roster spot that was opened with Za'Darius Smith being put on injured reserve. He was waived on November 13, and re-signed to the practice squad three days later. He was elevated to the active roster on November 20 ahead of a Week 11 game against the Minnesota Vikings. He was elevated to the active roster again on November 27 ahead of a Week 12 game against the Los Angeles Rams. He was elevated to the active roster the third time on January 8, 2022, ahead of a Week 18 game against the Detroit Lions. On January 25, 2022, he signed a reserve/future contract with the Packers. He was waived on August 30, and signed to the practice squad the next day.

2022
On October 22, 2022, Hamilton was elevated to the active roster for the week 7 game against the Washington Commanders and once again three weeks later against the Dallas Cowboys. On November 17, 2022, Hamilton was elevated to the active roster for the week 11 game against the Tennessee Titans. He signed a reserve/future contract on January 10, 2023.

NFL career statistics

Regular season

References

External links
Green Bay Packers bio
North Texas Mean Green bio

Green Bay Packers players
Living people
1998 births
American football linebackers
Dallas Cowboys players
Tampa Bay Buccaneers players
North Texas Mean Green football players
Players of American football from Texas